American Sign Language (ASL), is a natural language that serves as the predominant sign language of Deaf communities in the United States of America and most of Anglophone Canada. ASL is a complete and organized visual language that is expressed by employing both manual and nonmanual features. Besides North America, dialects of ASL and ASL-based creoles are used in many countries around the world, including much of West Africa and parts of Southeast Asia. ASL is also widely learned as a second language, serving as a lingua franca. ASL is most closely related to French Sign Language (LSF). It has been proposed that ASL is a creole language of LSF, although ASL shows features atypical of creole languages, such as agglutinative morphology.

ASL originated in the early 19th century in the American School for the Deaf (ASD) in West Hartford, Connecticut, from a situation of language contact. Since then, ASL use has been propagated widely by schools for the deaf and Deaf community organizations. Despite its wide use, no accurate count of ASL users has been taken. Reliable estimates for American ASL users range from 250,000 to 500,000 persons, including a number of children of deaf adults and other hearing individuals.

ASL signs have a number of phonemic components, such as movement of the face, the torso, and the hands. ASL is not a form of pantomime although iconicity plays a larger role in ASL than in spoken languages. English loan words are often borrowed through fingerspelling, although ASL grammar is unrelated to that of English. ASL has verbal agreement and aspectual marking and has a productive system of forming agglutinative classifiers. Many linguists believe ASL to be a subject–verb–object language. However, there are several alternative proposals to account for ASL word order.

Classification 

ASL emerged as a language in the American School for the Deaf (ASD), founded by Thomas Gallaudet in 1817, which brought together Old French Sign Language, various village sign languages, and home sign systems. ASL was created in that situation by language contact. ASL was influenced by its forerunners but distinct from all of them.

The influence of French Sign Language (LSF) on ASL is readily apparent; for example, it has been found that about 58% of signs in modern ASL are cognate to Old French Sign Language signs. However, that is far less than the standard 80% measure used to determine whether related languages are actually dialects. That suggests that nascent ASL was highly affected by the other signing systems brought by the ASD students although the school's original director, Laurent Clerc, taught in LSF. In fact, Clerc reported that he often learned the students' signs rather than conveying LSF:

It has been proposed that ASL is a creole in which LSF is the superstrate language and the native village sign languages are substrate languages. However, more recent research has shown that modern ASL does not share many of the structural features that characterize creole languages. ASL may have begun as a creole and then undergone structural change over time, but it is also possible that it was never a creole-type language. There are modality-specific reasons that sign languages tend towards agglutination, such as the ability to simultaneously convey information via the face, head, torso, and other body parts. That might override creole characteristics such as the tendency towards isolating morphology. Additionally, Clerc and Thomas Hopkins Gallaudet may have used an artificially constructed form of manually coded language in instruction rather than true LSF.

Although the United States, the United Kingdom, and Australia share English as a common oral and written language, ASL is not mutually intelligible with either British Sign Language (BSL) or Auslan. All three languages show degrees of borrowing from English, but that alone is not sufficient for cross-language comprehension. It has been found that a relatively high percentage (37–44%) of ASL signs have similar translations in Auslan, which for oral languages would suggest that they belong to the same language family. However, that does not seem justified historically for ASL and Auslan, and it is likely that the resemblance is caused by the higher degree of iconicity in sign languages in general as well as contact with English.

American Sign Language is growing in popularity in many states. Many high school and university students desire to take it as a foreign language, but until recently, it was usually not considered a creditable foreign language elective. ASL users, however, have a very distinct culture, and they interact very differently when they talk. Their facial expressions and hand movements reflect what they are communicating. They also have their own sentence structure, which sets the language apart.

American Sign Language is now being accepted by many colleges as a language eligible for foreign language course credit; many states are making it mandatory to accept it as such. in some states however, this is only true with regard to high school coursework.

History 

Prior to the birth of ASL, sign language had been used by various communities in the United States. In the United States, as elsewhere in the world, hearing families with deaf children have historically employed ad hoc home sign, which often reaches much higher levels of sophistication than gestures used by hearing people in spoken conversation. As early as 1541 at first contact by Francisco Vásquez de Coronado, there were reports that the Indigenous peoples of the Great Plains widely spoke a sign language to communicate across vast national and linguistic lines.

In the 19th century, a "triangle" of village sign languages developed in New England: one in Martha's Vineyard, Massachusetts; one in Henniker, New Hampshire, and one in Sandy River Valley, Maine. Martha's Vineyard Sign Language (MVSL), which was particularly important for the history of ASL, was used mainly in Chilmark, Massachusetts. Due to intermarriage in the original community of English settlers of the 1690s, and the recessive nature of genetic deafness, Chilmark had a high 4% rate of genetic deafness. MVSL was used even by hearing residents whenever a deaf person was present, and also in some situations where spoken language would be ineffective or inappropriate, such as during church sermons or between boats at sea.

ASL is thought to have originated in the American School for the Deaf (ASD), founded in Hartford, Connecticut, in 1817. Originally known as The American Asylum, At Hartford, For The Education And Instruction Of The Deaf And Dumb, the school was founded by the Yale graduate and divinity student Thomas Hopkins Gallaudet. Gallaudet, inspired by his success in demonstrating the learning abilities of a young deaf girl Alice Cogswell, traveled to Europe in order to learn deaf pedagogy from European institutions. Ultimately, Gallaudet chose to adopt the methods of the French Institut National de Jeunes Sourds de Paris, and convinced Laurent Clerc, an assistant to the school's founder Charles-Michel de l'Épée, to accompany him back to the United States. Upon his return, Gallaudet founded the ASD on April 15, 1817.

The largest group of students during the first seven decades of the school were from Martha's Vineyard, and they brought MVSL with them. There were also 44 students from around Henniker, New Hampshire, and 27 from the Sandy River valley in Maine, each of which had their own village sign language. Other students brought knowledge of their own home signs. Laurent Clerc, the first teacher at ASD, taught using French Sign Language (LSF), which itself had developed in the Parisian school for the deaf established in 1755. From that situation of language contact, a new language emerged, now known as ASL.

 
More schools for the deaf were founded after ASD, and knowledge of ASL spread to those schools. In addition, the rise of Deaf community organizations bolstered the continued use of ASL. Societies such as the National Association of the Deaf and the National Fraternal Society of the Deaf held national conventions that attracted signers from across the country. All of that contributed to ASL's wide use over a large geographical area, atypical of a sign language.

While oralism, an approach to educating deaf students focusing on oral language, had previously been used in American schools, the Milan Congress made it dominant and effectively banned the use of sign languages at schools in the United States and Europe. However, the efforts of Deaf advocates and educators, more lenient enforcement of the Congress' mandate, and the use of ASL in religious education and proselytism ensured greater use and documentation compared to European sign languages, albeit more influenced by fingerspelled loanwords and borrowed idioms from English as students were societally pressured to achieve fluency in spoken language. Nevertheless, oralism remained the prominent method of deaf education up to the 1950s. Linguists did not consider sign language to be true "language" but as something inferior. Recognition of the legitimacy of ASL was achieved by William Stokoe, a linguist who arrived at Gallaudet University in 1955 when that was still the dominant assumption. Aided by the Civil Rights Movement of the 1960s, Stokoe argued for manualism, the use of sign language in deaf education. Stokoe noted that sign language shares the important features that oral languages have as a means of communication, and even devised a transcription system for ASL. In doing so, Stokoe revolutionized both deaf education and linguistics. In the 1960s, ASL was sometimes referred to as "Ameslan", but that term is now considered obsolete.

Population 
Counting the number of ASL signers is difficult because ASL users have never been counted by the American census. The ultimate source for current estimates of the number of ASL users in the United States is a report for the National Census of the Deaf Population (NCDP) by Schein and Delk (1974). Based on a 1972 survey of the NCDP, Schein and Delk provided estimates consistent with a signing population between 250,000 and 500,000. The survey did not distinguish between ASL and other forms of signing; in fact, the name "ASL" was not yet in widespread use.

Incorrect figures are sometimes cited for the population of ASL users in the United States based on misunderstandings of known statistics. Demographics of the deaf population have been confused with those of ASL use since adults who become deaf late in life rarely use ASL in the home. That accounts for currently-cited estimations that are greater than 500,000; such mistaken estimations can reach as high as 15,000,000. A 100,000-person lower bound has been cited for ASL users; the source of that figure is unclear, but it may be an estimate of prelingual deafness, which is correlated with but not equivalent to signing.

ASL is sometimes incorrectly cited as the third- or fourth-most-spoken language in the United States. Those figures misquote Schein and Delk (1974), who actually concluded that ASL speakers constituted the third-largest population "requiring an interpreter in court". Although that would make ASL the third-most used language among monolinguals other than English, it does not imply that it is the fourth-most-spoken language in the United States since speakers of other languages may also speak English.

Geographic distribution
ASL is used throughout Anglo-America. That contrasts with Europe, where a variety of sign languages are used within the same continent. The unique situation of ASL seems to have been caused by the proliferation of ASL through schools influenced by the American School for the Deaf, wherein ASL originated, and the rise of community organizations for the Deaf.

Throughout West Africa, ASL-based sign languages are signed by educated Deaf adults. Such languages, imported by boarding schools, are often considered by associations to be the official sign languages of their countries and are named accordingly, such as Nigerian Sign Language, Ghanaian Sign Language. Such signing systems are found in Benin, Burkina Faso, Ivory Coast, Ghana, Liberia, Mauritania, Mali, Nigeria, and Togo. Due to lack of data, it is still an open question how similar those sign languages are to the variety of ASL used in America.

In addition to the aforementioned West African countries, ASL is reported to be used as a first language in Barbados, Bolivia, Cambodia (alongside Cambodian Sign Language), the Central African Republic, Chad, China (Hong Kong), the Democratic Republic of the Congo, Gabon, Jamaica, Kenya, Madagascar, the Philippines, Singapore, and Zimbabwe. ASL is also used as a lingua franca throughout the deaf world, widely learned as a second language.

Regional variation

Sign production 
Sign production can often vary according to location. Signers from the South tend to sign with more flow and ease. Native signers from New York have been reported as signing comparatively quicker and sharper. Sign production of native Californian signers has also been reported as being fast. Research on that phenomenon often concludes that the fast-paced production for signers from the coasts could be due to the fast-paced nature of living in large metropolitan areas. That conclusion also supports how the ease with which Southern sign could be caused by the easygoing environment of the South in comparison to that of the coasts.

Sign production can also vary depending on age and native language. For example, sign production of letters may vary in older signers. Slight differences in finger spelling production can be a signal of age. Additionally, signers who learned American Sign Language as a second language vary in production. For Deaf signers who learned a different sign language before learning American Sign Language, qualities of their native language may show in their ASL production. Some examples of that varied production include fingerspelling towards the body, instead of away from it, and signing certain movement from bottom to top, instead of top to bottom. Hearing people who learn American Sign Language also have noticeable differences in signing production. The most notable production difference of hearing people learning American Sign Language is their rhythm and arm posture.

Sign variants 
Most popularly, there are variants of the signs for English words such as "birthday", "pizza", "Halloween", "early", and "soon", just a sample of the most commonly recognized signs with variants based on regional change. The sign for "school" is commonly varied between black and white signers. The variation between signs produced by black and white signers is sometimes referred to as Black American Sign Language.

History and implications 
The prevalence of residential Deaf schools can account for much of the regional variance of signs and sign productions across the United States. Deaf schools often serve students of the state in which the school resides. That limited access to signers from other regions, combined with the residential quality of Deaf Schools promoted specific use of certain sign variants. Native signers did not have much access to signers from other regions during the beginning years of their education. It is hypothesized that because of that seclusion, certain variants of a sign prevailed over others due to the choice of variant used by the student of the school/signers in the community.

However, American Sign Language does not appear to be vastly varied in comparison to other signed languages. That is because when Deaf education was beginning in the United States, many educators flocked to the American School for the Deaf in Hartford, Connecticut, whose central location for the first generation of educators in Deaf education to learn American Sign Language allows ASL to be more standardized than its variant.

Varieties 

Varieties of ASL are found throughout the world. There is little difficulty in comprehension among the varieties of the United States and Canada.

Mutual intelligibility among those ASL varieties is high, and the variation is primarily lexical. For example, there are three different words for English about in Canadian ASL; the standard way, and two regional variations (Atlantic and Ontario). Variation may also be phonological, meaning that the same sign may be signed in a different way depending on the region. For example, an extremely common type of variation is between the handshapes /1/, /L/, and /5/ in signs with one handshape.

There is also a distinct variety of ASL used by the Black Deaf community. Black ASL evolved as a result of racially segregated schools in some states, which included the residential schools for the deaf. Black ASL differs from standard ASL in vocabulary, phonology, and some grammatical structure. While African American English (AAE) is generally viewed as more innovating than standard English, Black ASL is more conservative than standard ASL, preserving older forms of many signs. Black sign language speakers use more two-handed signs than in mainstream ASL, are less likely to show assimilatory lowering of signs produced on the forehead (e.g. KNOW) and use a wider signing space. Modern Black ASL borrows a number of idioms from AAE; for instance, the AAE idiom "I feel you" is calqued into Black ASL.

ASL is used internationally as a lingua franca, and a number of closely related sign languages derived from ASL are used in many different countries. Even so, there have been varying degrees of divergence from standard ASL in those imported ASL varieties. Bolivian Sign Language is reported to be a dialect of ASL, no more divergent than other acknowledged dialects. On the other hand, it is also known that some imported ASL varieties have diverged to the extent of being separate languages. For example, Malaysian Sign Language, which has ASL origins, is no longer mutually comprehensible with ASL and must be considered its own language. For some imported ASL varieties, such as those used in West Africa, it is still an open question how similar they are to American ASL.

When communicating with hearing English speakers, ASL-speakers often use what is commonly called Pidgin Signed English (PSE) or 'contact signing', a blend of English structure with ASL vocabulary.  Various types of PSE exist, ranging from highly English-influenced PSE (practically relexified English) to PSE which is quite close to ASL lexically and grammatically, but may alter some subtle features of ASL grammar. Fingerspelling may be used more often in PSE than it is normally used in ASL. There have been some constructed sign languages, known as Manually Coded English (MCE), which match English grammar exactly and simply replace spoken words with signs; those systems are not considered to be varieties of ASL.

Tactile ASL (TASL) is a variety of ASL used throughout the United States by and with the deaf-blind. It is particularly common among those with Usher's syndrome. It results in deafness from birth followed by loss of vision later in life; consequently, those with Usher's syndrome often grow up in the Deaf community using ASL, and later transition to TASL. TASL differs from ASL in that signs are produced by touching the palms, and there are some grammatical differences from standard ASL in order to compensate for the lack of nonmanual signing.

ASL changes over time and from generation to generation. The sign for telephone has changed as the shape of phones and the manner of holding them have changed. The development of telephones with screens has also changed ASL, encouraging the use of signs that can be seen on small screens.

Stigma 
In 2013, the White House published a response to a petition that gained over 37,000 signatures to officially recognize American Sign Language as a community language and a language of instruction in schools. The response is titled "there shouldn't be any stigma about American Sign Language" and addressed that ASL is a vital language for the Deaf and hard of hearing. Stigmas associated with sign languages and the use of sign for educating children often lead to the absence of sign during periods in children's lives when they can access languages most effectively. Scholars such as Beth S. Benedict advocate not only for bilingualism (using ASL and English training) but also for early childhood intervention for children who are deaf.  York University psychologist Ellen Bialystok has also campaigned for bilingualism, arguing that those who are bilingual acquire cognitive skills that may help to prevent dementia later in life.

Most children born to deaf parents are hearing. Known as CODAs ("Children Of Deaf Adults"), they are often more culturally Deaf than deaf children, most of whom are born to hearing parents. Unlike many deaf children, CODAs acquire ASL as well as Deaf cultural values and behaviors from birth. Such bilingual hearing children may be mistakenly labeled as being "slow learners" or as having "language difficulties" because of preferential attitudes towards spoken language.

Writing systems 

Although there is no well-established writing system for ASL, written sign language dates back almost two centuries. The first systematic writing system for a sign language seems to be that of Roch-Ambroise Auguste Bébian, developed in 1825. However, written sign language remained marginal among the public. In the 1960s, linguist William Stokoe created Stokoe notation specifically for ASL. It is alphabetic, with a letter or diacritic for every phonemic (distinctive) hand shape, orientation, motion, and position, though it lacks any representation of facial expression, and is better suited for individual words than for extended passages of text. Stokoe used that system for his 1965 A Dictionary of American Sign Language on Linguistic Principles.

SignWriting, proposed in 1974 by Valerie Sutton, is the first writing system to gain use among the public and the first writing system for sign languages to be included in the Unicode Standard. SignWriting consists of more than 5000 distinct iconic graphs/glyphs. Currently, it is in use in many schools for the Deaf, particularly in Brazil, and has been used in International Sign forums with speakers and researchers in more than 40 countries, including Brazil, Ethiopia, France, Germany, Italy, Portugal, Saudi Arabia, Slovenia, Tunisia, and the United States. Sutton SignWriting has both a printed and an electronically produced form so that persons can use the system anywhere that oral languages are written (personal letters, newspapers, and media, academic research). The systematic examination of the International Sign Writing Alphabet (ISWA) as an equivalent usage structure to the International Phonetic Alphabet for spoken languages has been proposed. According to some researchers, SignWriting is not a phonemic orthography and does not have a one-to-one map from phonological forms to written forms. That assertion has been disputed, and the process for each country to look at the ISWA and create a phonemic/morphemic assignment of features of each sign language was proposed by researchers Msc. Roberto Cesar Reis da Costa and Madson Barreto in a thesis forum on June 23, 2014. The SignWriting community has an open project on Wikimedia Labs to support the various Wikimedia projects on Wikimedia Incubator and elsewhere involving SignWriting.  The ASL Wikipedia request was marked as eligible in 2008 and the test ASL Wikipedia has 50 articles written in ASL using SignWriting.

The most widely used transcription system among academics is HamNoSys, developed at the University of Hamburg. Based on Stokoe Notation, HamNoSys was expanded to about 200 graphs in order to allow transcription of any sign language. Phonological features are usually indicated with single symbols, though the group of features that make up a handshape is indicated collectively with a symbol.

Several additional candidates for written ASL have appeared over the years, including SignFont, ASL-phabet, and Si5s.

For English-speaking audiences, ASL is often glossed using English words. Such glosses are typically all-capitalized and are arranged in ASL order. For example, the ASL sentence DOG NOW CHASE>IX=3 CAT, meaning "the dog is chasing the cat", uses NOW to mark ASL progressive aspect and shows ASL verbal inflection for the third person (written with >IX=3). However, glossing is not used to write the language for speakers of ASL.

Phonology 

Each sign in ASL is composed of a number of distinctive components, generally referred to as parameters. A sign may use one hand or both. All signs can be described using the five parameters involved in signed languages, which are handshape, movement, palm orientation, location and nonmanual markers. Just as phonemes of sound distinguish meaning in spoken languages, those parameters are the phonemes that distinguish meaning in signed languages like ASL. Changing any one of them may change the meaning of a sign, as illustrated by the ASL signs THINK and DISAPPOINTED:

There are also meaningful nonmanual signals in ASL, which may include movement of the eyebrows, the cheeks, the nose, the head, the torso, and the eyes.

William Stokoe proposed that such components are analogous to the phonemes of spoken languages. There has also been a proposal that they are analogous to classes like place and manner of articulation. As in spoken languages, those phonological units can be split into distinctive features. For instance, the handshapes /2/ and /3/ are distinguished by the presence or absence of the feature [± closed thumb], as illustrated to the right. ASL has processes of allophony and phonotactic restrictions. There is ongoing research into whether ASL has an analog of syllables in spoken language.

Grammar

Morphology 
ASL has a rich system of verbal inflection, which involves both grammatical aspect: how the action of verbs flows in time—and agreement marking. Aspect can be marked by changing the manner of movement of the verb; for example, continuous aspect is marked by incorporating rhythmic, circular movement, while punctual aspect is achieved by modifying the sign so that it has a stationary hand position. Verbs may agree with both the subject and the object, and are marked for number and reciprocity. Reciprocity is indicated by using two one-handed signs; for example, the sign SHOOT, made with an L-shaped handshape with inward movement of the thumb, inflects to SHOOT[reciprocal], articulated by having two L-shaped hands "shooting" at each other.

ASL has a productive system of classifiers, which are used to classify objects and their movement in space. For example, a rabbit running downhill would use a classifier consisting of a bent V classifier handshape with a downhill-directed path; if the rabbit is hopping, the path is executed with a bouncy manner. In general, classifiers are composed of a "classifier handshape" bound to a "movement root". The classifier handshape represents the object as a whole, incorporating such attributes as surface, depth, and shape, and is usually very iconic. The movement root consists of a path, a direction and a manner.

Fingerspelling 

ASL possesses a set of 26 signs known as the American manual alphabet, which can be used to spell out words from the English language. Such signs make use of the 19 handshapes of ASL. For example, the signs for 'p' and 'k' use the same handshape but different orientations. A common misconception is that ASL consists only of fingerspelling; although such a method (Rochester Method) has been used, it is not ASL.

Fingerspelling is a form of borrowing, a linguistic process wherein words from one language are incorporated into another. In ASL, fingerspelling is used for proper nouns and for technical terms with no native ASL equivalent. There are also some other loan words which are fingerspelled, either very short English words or abbreviations of longer English words, e.g. O-N from English 'on', and A-P-T from English 'apartment'. Fingerspelling may also be used to emphasize a word that would normally be signed otherwise.

Syntax 
ASL is a subject–verb–object (SVO) language, but various phenomena affect that basic word order. Basic SVO sentences are signed without any pauses:

However, other word orders may also occur since ASL allows the topic of a sentence to be moved to sentence-initial position, a phenomenon known as topicalization. In object–subject–verb (OSV) sentences, the object is topicalized, marked by a forward head-tilt and a pause:

Besides, word orders can be obtained through the phenomenon of subject copy in which the subject is repeated at the end of the sentence, accompanied by head nodding for clarification or emphasis:

ASL also allows null subject sentences whose subject is implied, rather than stated explicitly. Subjects can be copied even in a null subject sentence, and the subject is then omitted from its original position, yielding a verb–object–subject (VOS) construction:

Topicalization, accompanied with a null subject and a subject copy, can produce yet another word order, object–verb–subject (OVS).

Those properties of ASL allow it a variety of word orders, leading many to question which is the true, underlying, "basic" order. There are several other proposals that attempt to account for the flexibility of word order in ASL. One proposal is that languages like ASL are best described with a topic–comment structure whose words are ordered by their importance in the sentence, rather than by their syntactic properties. Another hypothesis is that ASL exhibits free word order, in which syntax is not encoded in word order but can be encoded by other means such as head nods, eyebrow movement, and body position.

Iconicity 
Common misconceptions are that signs are iconically self-explanatory, that they are a transparent imitation of what they mean, or even that they are pantomime. In fact, many signs bear no resemblance to their referent because they were originally arbitrary symbols, or their iconicity has been obscured over time. Even so, in ASL iconicity plays a significant role; a high percentage of signs resemble their referents in some way. That may be because the medium of sign, three-dimensional space, naturally allows more iconicity than oral language.

In the era of the influential linguist Ferdinand de Saussure, it was assumed that the mapping between form and meaning in language must be completely arbitrary. Although onomatopoeia is a clear exception, since words like 'choo-choo' bear clear resemblance to the sounds that they mimic, the Saussurean approach was to treat them as marginal exceptions. ASL, with its significant inventory of iconic signs, directly challenges that theory.

Research on acquisition of pronouns in ASL has shown that children do not always take advantage of the iconic properties of signs when they interpret their meaning. It has been found that when children acquire the pronoun "you", the iconicity of the point (at the child) is often confused, being treated more like a name. That is a similar finding to research in oral languages on pronoun acquisition. It has also been found that iconicity of signs does not affect immediate memory and recall; less iconic signs are remembered just as well as highly-iconic signs.

See also 
 American Sign Language grammar
 American Sign Language literature
 Baby sign language
 Bimodal bilingualism
 Great ape language, of which ASL has been one attempted mode
 Legal recognition of sign languages
 Pointing
 Sign name
 ASL interpreting

Notes

References

Bibliography

External links 

 
 Accessible American Sign Language vocabulary site
 American Sign Language discussion forum
 One-stop resource American Sign Language and video dictionary
 National Institute of Deafness ASL section
 National Association of the Deaf ASL information
 American Sign Language
 The American Sign Language Linguistics Research Project
 Video Dictionary of ASL
 American Sign Language Dictionary

 
American Sign Language family
Articles containing video clips
Deaf culture in the United States
French Sign Language family
Fusional languages
Languages of Barbados
Languages of Belize
Languages of Botswana
Languages of Burundi
Sign languages of Canada
Languages of Grenada
Languages of Guyana
Languages of Haiti
Languages of Saint Kitts and Nevis
Languages of Saint Vincent and the Grenadines
Languages of the United States Virgin Islands
Sign languages of the United States
Languages of Zimbabwe
Subject–verb–object languages
1817 introductions
Languages attested from the 19th century
Languages of Canada
Languages of the United States